Phycobiliproteins are water-soluble proteins present in cyanobacteria and certain algae (rhodophytes, cryptomonads, glaucocystophytes). They capture light energy, which is then passed on to chlorophylls during photosynthesis. Phycobiliproteins are formed of a complex between proteins and  covalently bound phycobilins that act as chromophores (the light-capturing part).  They are most important constituents of the phycobilisomes.

Major phycobiliproteins

Characteristics 
Phycobiliproteins demonstrate superior fluorescent properties compared to small organic fluorophores, especially when high sensitivity or multicolor detection required :
 Broad and high absorption of light suits many light sources
 Very intense emission of light: 10-20 times brighter than small organic fluorophores
 Relative large Stokes shift gives low background, and allows multicolor detections.
 Excitation and emission spectra do not overlap compared to conventional organic dyes.
 Can be used in tandem (simultaneous use by FRET) with conventional chromophores (i.e. PE and FITC, or APC and SR101 with the same light source).
 Longer fluorescence retention period.
 High water solubility

Applications 
Phycobiliproteins allow very high detection sensitivity, and can be used in various fluorescence based techniques fluorimetric microplate assays, FISH and multicolor detection.

They are under development for use in artificial photosynthesis, limited by the relatively low conversion efficiency of 4-5%.

References

Photosynthetic pigments
Cyanobacteria proteins
Algae
Bacterial proteins